Philip Mortimer Brown (April 30, 1916 – February 9, 2006) was an American actor.

Early life
Brown was born in Cambridge, Massachusetts, in 1916. He majored in dramatics at Stanford University, where he was a member of the Beta Theta Pi fraternity.

Career
Brown played some of his first roles on stage when he joined the Group Theatre in New York City. The Group Theatre eventually closed, and many of its members relocated to Hollywood, where Brown helped found the Actors' Laboratory Theatre. He found his first cinema roles here, making his motion picture debut in Mitchell Leisen's 1941 war movie, I Wanted Wings.

In 1946, he played Ernest Hemingway's protagonist Nick Adams in Robert Siodmak's version of The Killers, alongside William Conrad and Charles McGraw as the titular "killers".

In 1948, he played Tom in Tennessee Williams's The Glass Menagerie, at the Haymarket Theatre London, in a production directed by John Gielgud.

His association with the Lab came back to haunt him later in the decade, when its members fell under the scrutiny of the House Un-American Activities Committee. Although he was not a communist, Brown was blacklisted in 1952, and was eventually compelled to relocate with his family to the United Kingdom between 1953 and 1993.

Overseas he was able to resume acting on stage, TV and films; he also directed for the stage and TV. He was best known for his role as Luke Skywalker's uncle, Owen Lars, in Star Wars (1977).

He returned to the United States in the 1990s and in later years made the rounds of autograph shows.

Death
Phil Brown died in his sleep of pneumonia on February 9, 2006, at the age of 89, two months shy of his 90th birthday.

Legacy
His wife Ginny survives him with their son; two grandchildren and a great-grandchild.

Filmography

Film

Television

References

External links

 
 
 
 

1916 births
2006 deaths
American expatriate male actors in the United Kingdom
American expatriates in England
American male film actors
American male television actors
Hollywood blacklist
Male actors from Cambridge, Massachusetts
Stanford University alumni
Deaths from pneumonia in California
20th-century American male actors